Shadow Plays is a solo piano album by Craig Taborn. It was recorded in concert in March 2020 and was released by ECM Records the following year.

Background
Taborn's previous solo piano album, Avenging Angel, was recorded in 2010. Since then, he had performed and recorded in a diverse range of bands and styles.

Recording and music
The album was recorded in concert at the Mozart-Saal of the Konzerthaus, Vienna, on March 2, 2020. The concert was billed as Avenging Angel II. All seven of the solo piano pieces were improvised. The album was produced by Manfred Eicher.

Release and reception

Shadow Plays was released by ECM Records on 8 October 2021. The AllMusic reviewer concluded: "Where Avenging Angel opened our ears to Taborn's consummate abilities to compose and organize simultaneously without surrendering his creativity, Shadow Plays extends that by offering a profound sense of intimacy with instrument and audience. It delivers fantastical groups of ideas that flow without undue force or ego to become something that is at once wondrous and revelatory." The reviewer for the Financial Times wrote that the album features Taborn "delivering spontaneous masterworks with a majestic sense of form and captures his robust touch and uncanny sense of space in pristine sound".

Track listing
All compositions by Craig Taborn.

"Bird Templars" – 17:02
"Discordia Concors" – 8:57
"Conspiracy of Things" – 5:50
"Concordia Discors" – 11:59
"A Code with Spells" – 8:09
"Shadow Play" – 18:37
"Now in Hope" – 5:47

Personnel
Craig Taborn – piano

References

2021 live albums
Albums produced by Manfred Eicher
Craig Taborn albums
ECM Records albums
Solo piano jazz albums